Kurt Walker (June 10, 1954 – August 17, 2018) was an American professional ice hockey player who played 71 games in the National Hockey League (NHL) for the Toronto Maple Leafs between 1976 and 1978.

Career
Walker started his professional career with the Saginaw Gears, of the International Hockey League, in the 1974–75 IHL season.

Walker played 71 NHL games, over parts of the 1975–76 through 1977–78 NHL seasons, all with the Toronto Maple Leafs. He scored his first career NHL goal against the Vancouver Canucks on January 21, 1977. Walker scored 9 points in the NHL and accrued 152 penalty minutes.

He closed out his professional career with the Adirondack Red Wings of the American Hockey League in the 1979–80 AHL season.

Post–playing career 
Playing as an enforcer throughout his hockey career, Walker required 17 surgeries to repair injuries.  He criticized the NHL Alumni organization, which he claimed did not support retired players enough financially. As a result, he created an organization called Dignity after Hockey to raise awareness and funds to provide health care to retired players. In 2017, he added his name to a class-action lawsuit against the NHL alleging neglect of support for players suffering injuries and financial strain once retired.

Death 
Walker died in Atlanta, Georgia on August 17, 2018 from sepsis.

Career statistics

Regular season and playoffs

References

External links 
 

1954 births
2018 deaths
American men's ice hockey right wingers
Binghamton Dusters players
Dallas Black Hawks players
Deaths from sepsis
Ice hockey players from Massachusetts
Oklahoma City Blazers (1965–1977) players
Saginaw Gears players
Sportspeople from Weymouth, Massachusetts
Syracuse Firebirds players
Toronto Maple Leafs players
Tulsa Oilers (1964–1984) players
Undrafted National Hockey League players